The 2008 Price LeBlanc Lexus Pro Tennis Classic singles was a tennis competition event of the Association of Tennis Professionals (ATP), the secondary professional tennis circuit organized by the ATP. The 2008 ATP series calendar comprised 176 tournaments, with prize money ranging from $25,000 up to $150,000.

Izak van der Merwe was the defending champion (while the tournament was part of the ITF Men's Circuit), but lost in first round to Martin Fischer. Bobby Reynolds won the title by defeating Igor Kunitsyn 6–3, 6–7(3–7), 7–5 in the final.

Seeds

Draws

Finals

Section 1

Section 2

References

External links
 Main Draw (ATP)
 Qualifying Draw (ATP)

2008 ATP Challenger Series
2008 in American tennis
2008,Price LeBlanc Lexus Pro Tennis Classic,Singles
2008 in sports in Louisiana
2008